

The following lists events that happened during 1948 in Afghanistan.

Relations between Afghanistan and Pakistan are peaceful and formally correct. The unsettled relations between Pakistan and India, however, interfere with the Afghan foreign trade which for decades had gone mostly by the Khyber Pass. Another reason for the unfavourable balance of trade is the falling price of Karakul lambskins, the most valuable of the country's exports. Three new motor roads are under construction in 1948: Kabul to Mazar, Kabul to Khyber Pass, and the Badakhshan road from Kabul toward Sinkiang province, China.

Incumbents
 Monarch – Mohammed Zahir Shah
 Prime Minister – Shah Mahmud Khan

March 29, 1948
It is announced that the British legation at Kabul and the Afghan legation in London are to be raised to the status of embassies. On June 5 a similar step is taken between the US and Afghanistan.

References 

 
Afghanistan
Years of the 20th century in Afghanistan
Afghanistan
1940s in Afghanistan